MATIF SA (French: Marché à Terme International de France) is a private corporation which is both a  futures exchange and a clearing house in France. It was absorbed in the merger of the Paris Bourse with Euronext NV to form Euronext Paris. Derivatives formerly traded on the Matif and other members of Euronext are traded on LIFFE Connect, the electronic trading platform of the London International Financial Futures Exchange. LIFFE is an affiliate of Euronext.

Products include interest rate futures and options on the Euro notional bond, five year Euro, and three month PIBOR (Paris Interbank Offered Rate), and futures on the 30-year Eurobond and two-year E-note; futures on the CAC 40 Index, STOXX Europe 50, EURO STOXX 50; and futures and options on European rapeseed and futures on rapeseed meal, European rapeseed oil, milling wheat, corn and sunflower seeds.

MATIF is also the name by which the French regulators name any market where futures contracts are traded under French Law.

References

See also
Euronext Paris
OMF

Futures exchanges